Vivien Edward Felton (13 August 1929 — 13 October 2005) was an English footballer who played as a left-half.

Career
Felton began his career with local club Southgate Athletic, before moving across north London to sign for Barnet. In 1954, Felton signed for Crystal Palace, making two league appearances over the course of two years, before returning to Non-League football to sign for Tonbridge.

References

1929 births
2005 deaths
Association football midfielders
English footballers
People from Southgate, London
Barnet F.C. players
Crystal Palace F.C. players
Tonbridge Angels F.C. players
English Football League players